Petrol Ofisi was a sports club founded in Ankara in 1954. It received the name of Petrol Ofisi (POAS; Petroleum Agency) in 2000, after the privatization of POAS. Petrol Ofisi withdrew due to financial difficulties. In 2010 the registration was revoked and the club was closed by the Turkish Football Federation. They played in the first division in the 1994–1995 season. Osvaldo Nartallo was a player of Petrol Ofisi.

League performance
 Turkish Super League: 1994–95
 TFF First League: 1964–68, 1981–94, 1995–96, 1998–99
 TFF Second League: 1968–79, 1996–98, 1999–01
 TFF Third League: 2001–02
 Amateur Leagues: 1954–64, 1979-81

References

Football clubs in Turkey
1954 establishments in Turkey
2010 disestablishments in Turkey
Sports clubs established in 1954
Süper Lig clubs